Christine L. Borgman is Distinguished Professor and Presidential Chair in Information Studies at UCLA. She is the author of more than 200 publications in the fields of information studies, computer science, and communication. Two of her sole-authored monographs, Scholarship in the Digital Age: Information, Infrastructure, and the Internet (MIT Press, 2007) and From Gutenberg to the Global Information Infrastructure: Access to Information in a Networked World (MIT Press, 2000), have won the Best Information Science Book of the Year award from the American Society for Information Science and Technology. She is a lead investigator for the Center for Embedded Networked Sensing (CENS), a National Science Foundation Science and Technology Center, where she conducts data practices research. She chaired the Task Force on Cyberlearning for the NSF, whose report, Fostering Learning in the Networked World, was released in July, 2008.  Prof. Borgman is a Fellow of the American Association for the Advancement of Science (AAAS), a Legacy Laureate of the University of Pittsburgh, and is the 2011 recipient of the Paul Evan Peters Award from the Coalition for Networked Information, Association for Research Libraries, and EDUCAUSE. The award recognizes notable, lasting achievements in the creation and innovative use of information resources and services that advance scholarship and intellectual productivity through communication networks. She is also the 2011 recipient of the Research in Information Science Award from the American Association of Information Science and Technology. In 2013 she became a fellow of the Association for Computing Machinery.

Borgman leads the Center for Knowledge Infrastructures (CKI) located in the UCLA Department of Information Studies. CKI conducts research on scientific data practices and policy, scholarly communication, and socio-technical systems.

She is a member of the U.S. National Academies’ Board on Research Data and Information and the U.S. National CODATA (Committee on Data for Science and Technology), the Strategic Advisory Board to Thomson-Reuters Scholarly Research, the advisory board to the Electronic Privacy Information Center, and Member-at-Large for Section T (Information, Computing, and Communication) of the AAAS. At UCLA, she chairs the Information Technology Planning Board. Previous service includes chairing Section T of the AAAS, and membership on the Science Advisory Board to Microsoft Corporation, the Board of Directors of the Council on Library and Information Resources, and the advisory board to the Computer & Information Science & Engineering Directorate of the National Science Foundation, and the Association for Computing Machinery Public Policy Council.

Borgman is a frequent speaker at conferences and university events. Recent keynotes and plenary presentations include the Oxford Internet Institute's 10th anniversary conference, A Decade in Internet Time, the International Conference on Asian Digital Libraries, Coalition for Networked Information, Santa Fe Institute, Digital Humanities Conference, Joint Conference on Digital Libraries, 40th Anniversary Conference of the Open University, Marschak Lecture (UCLA), Kanazawa Institute International Seminar on Libraries (Japan), and invited talks at Oxford University, Harvard University, Columbia University, University of Pittsburgh, and Michigan State University.

She is a member of the editorial boards of the Journal of the American Society for Information Science and Technology, Annual Review of Information Science and Technology, Journal of Digital Information, International Journal of Digital Curation, ASInformation Research, Policy and Internet, and the Journal of Library & Information Science Research. Previous editorial board service includes The Information Society, Journal of Computer-Mediated Communication, Journal of Communication Research, Journal of Computer-Supported Cooperative Work, and the Journal of Documentation. She was Program Chair for the First Joint Conference on Digital Libraries (ACM and IEEE) and serves on program committees for the International Conference on Asian Digital Libraries, the Joint Conference on Digital Libraries, the European Conference on Digital Libraries, American Society for Information Science and Technology, and Conceptions of Library and Information Science (COLIS) conferences.

Borgman's international activities include posts as a visiting scholar at the Oxford Internet Institute, a Fulbright Visiting Professor at the University of Economic Sciences (now Corvinus University of Budapest) and at Eötvös Loránd University in Budapest, Hungary, a visiting professor in the Department of Information Science at Loughborough University, and a Scholar-in-Residence at the Rockefeller Foundation Study and Conference Center in Bellagio, Italy.

She holds the Ph.D. in Communication from Stanford University, M.L.S. from the University of Pittsburgh, and B.A. in Mathematics from Michigan State University.

Partial bibliography
Effective online searching : a basic text (M. Dekker, 1984)
Scholarly communication and bibliometrics (Sage, 1990)
From Gutenberg to the global information infrastructure : access to information in the networked world (MIT Press, 2000)
Scholarship in the Digital Age: Information, Infrastructure, and the Internet (MIT Press, 2007)
Big Data, Little Data, No Data: Scholarship in the Networked World (MIT Press, 2015)

References

External links
Borgman's Website
Borgman's Faculty Web Page
Borgman's Faculty Website (Previous)
UCLA Department of Information Studies
UCLA Center for Knowledge Knowledge Infrastructures

1951 births
Bibliometricians
Living people
UCLA Graduate School of Education and Information Studies faculty
Stanford University alumni
University of Pittsburgh alumni
Michigan State University alumni
Place of birth missing (living people)
Fellows of the Association for Computing Machinery